Nitroglycerin (NG), (alternative spelling of nitroglycerine) also known as trinitroglycerin (TNG), nitro, glyceryl trinitrate (GTN), or 1,2,3-trinitroxypropane, is a dense, colorless, oily, explosive liquid most commonly produced by nitrating glycerol with white fuming nitric acid under conditions appropriate to the formation of the nitric acid ester. Chemically, the substance is an organic nitrate compound rather than a nitro compound, but the traditional name is retained. Invented in 1847 by Ascanio Sobrero, nitroglycerin has been used ever since as an active ingredient in the manufacture of explosives, namely dynamite, and as such it is employed in the construction, demolition, and mining industries. Since the 1880s, it has been used by militaries as an active ingredient and gelatinizer for nitrocellulose in some solid propellants such as cordite and ballistite. It is a major component in double-based smokeless propellants used by reloaders. Combined with nitrocellulose, hundreds of powder combinations are used by rifle, pistol, and shotgun reloaders.

Nitroglycerin has been used for over 130 years in medicine as a potent vasodilator (dilation of the vascular system) to treat heart conditions, such as angina pectoris and chronic heart failure. Though it was previously known that these beneficial effects are due to nitroglycerin being converted to nitric oxide, a potent venodilator, the enzyme for this conversion was only discovered to be mitochondrial aldehyde dehydrogenase (ALDH2) in 2002. Nitroglycerin is available in sublingual tablets, sprays, ointments, and patches.

History 
Nitroglycerin was the first practical explosive produced that was stronger than black powder. It was first synthesized by the Italian chemist Ascanio Sobrero in 1847, working under Théophile-Jules Pelouze at the University of Turin. Sobrero initially called his discovery pyroglycerine and warned vigorously against its use as an explosive.

Nitroglycerin was later adopted as a commercially useful explosive by Alfred Nobel, who experimented with safer ways to handle the dangerous compound after his younger brother, Emil Oskar Nobel, and several factory workers were killed in an explosion at the Nobels' armaments factory in 1864 in Heleneborg, Sweden.

One year later, Nobel founded Alfred Nobel and Company in Germany and built an isolated factory in the Krümmel hills of Geesthacht near Hamburg. This business exported a liquid combination of nitroglycerin and gunpowder called "Blasting Oil", but this was extremely unstable and difficult to handle, as evidenced in numerous catastrophes. The buildings of the Krümmel factory were destroyed twice.

In April 1866, three crates of nitroglycerin were shipped to California for the Central Pacific Railroad, which planned to experiment with it as a blasting explosive to expedite the construction of the  Summit Tunnel through the Sierra Nevada Mountains. One of the crates exploded, destroying a Wells Fargo company office in San Francisco and killing 15 people. This led to a complete ban on the transportation of liquid nitroglycerin in California. The on-site manufacture of nitroglycerin was thus required for the remaining hard-rock drilling and blasting required for the completion of the First transcontinental railroad in North America.

On Christmas Day 1867 an attempt to dispose of nine canisters of Blasting Oil that had been illegally stored at the White Swan Inn in the centre of Newcastle Upon Tyne resulted in an explosion on the Town Moor that killed eight people. In June 1869, two one-ton wagons loaded with nitroglycerin, then known locally as Powder-Oil, exploded in the road at the North Wales village of Cwm-y-glo. The explosion led to the loss of six lives, many injuries and much damage to the village. Little trace was found of the two horses. The UK Government was so alarmed at the damage caused and what could have happened in a city location (these two tons were part of a larger load coming from Germany via Liverpool) that they soon passed The Nitro-Glycerine Act of 1869. Liquid nitroglycerin was widely banned elsewhere, as well, and these legal restrictions led to Alfred Nobel and his company's developing dynamite in 1867. This was made by mixing nitroglycerin with diatomaceous earth ("Kieselguhr" in German) found in the Krümmel hills. Similar mixtures, such as "dualine" (1867), "lithofracteur" (1869), and "gelignite" (1875), were formed by mixing nitroglycerin with other inert absorbents, and many combinations were tried by other companies in attempts to get around Nobel's tightly held patents for dynamite.

Dynamite mixtures containing nitrocellulose, which increases the viscosity of the mix, are commonly known as "gelatins".

Following the discovery that amyl nitrite helped alleviate chest pain, the physician William Murrell experimented with the use of nitroglycerin to alleviate angina pectoris and to reduce the blood pressure. He began treating his patients with small diluted doses of nitroglycerin in 1878, and this treatment was soon adopted into widespread use after Murrell published his results in the journal The Lancet in 1879. A few months before his death in 1896, Alfred Nobel was prescribed nitroglycerin for this heart condition, writing to a friend: "Isn't it the irony of fate that I have been prescribed nitro-glycerin, to be taken internally! They call it Trinitrin, so as not to scare the chemist and the public." The medical establishment also used the name "glyceryl trinitrate" for the same reason.

Wartime production rates 
Large quantities of nitroglycerin were manufactured during World War I and World War II for use as military propellants and in military engineering work. During World War I, HM Factory, Gretna, the largest propellant factory in the United Kingdom, produced about 800 tonnes of cordite RDB per week. This amount required at least 336 tonnes of nitroglycerin per week (assuming no losses in production). The Royal Navy had its own factory at the Royal Navy Cordite Factory, Holton Heath, in Dorset, England. A large cordite factory was also built in Canada during World War I. The Canadian Explosives Limited cordite factory at Nobel, Ontario, was designed to produce  of cordite per month, requiring about 286 tonnes of nitroglycerin per month.

Instability and desensitization 
In its undiluted form, nitroglycerin is a contact explosive, with physical shock causing it to explode. If it has not been adequately purified during manufacture it can degrade over time to even more unstable forms. This makes nitroglycerin highly dangerous to transport or use. In its undiluted form, it is one of the world's most powerful explosives, comparable to the more recently developed RDX and PETN.

Early in its history,  liquid nitroglycerin was found to be  "desensitized" by freezing it at a temperature below  depending on its purity. Its sensitivity to shock while frozen is somewhat unpredictable: "It is more insensitive to the shock from a fulminate cap or a rifle ball when in that condition but on the other hand it appears to be more liable to explode on breaking, crushing, tamping, etc." Frozen nitroglycerine is much less energetic than liquid, and so must be thawed before use. Thawing it out can be extremely sensitizing, especially if impurities are present or the warming is too rapid. Ethylene glycol dinitrate or another polynitrate may be added to lower the melting point and thereby avoid the necessity of thawing frozen explosive.

Chemically "desensitizing" nitroglycerin is possible to a point where it can be considered about as "safe" as modern high explosives, such as by the addition of ethanol, acetone, or dinitrotoluene. The nitroglycerin may have to be extracted from the desensitizer chemical to restore its effectiveness before use, for example by adding water to draw off ethanol used as a desensitizer.

Detonation 
The detonation velocity of nitroglycerin is 7820 meters per second, which is about 113% the speed of TNT. Accordingly, nitroglycerin is considered to be a high-brisance explosive, which is to say, it has excellent shattering ability. With a standard enthalpy of explosive decomposition of −1414 kJ/mol and a molecular weight of 227.0865 g/mol, nitroglycerin has a specific explosive energy density of 1.488 kilocalories per gram, or 6.23 kJ/g, making nitroglycerin 49% more energetic on a mass basis than the standard definitional value assigned to TNT (precisely 1 kcal/g).

Manufacturing 
Nitroglycerin can be produced by acid-catalyzed nitration of glycerol (glycerin).

The industrial manufacturing process often reacts glycerol with a nearly 1:1 mixture of concentrated sulfuric acid and concentrated nitric acid. This can be produced by mixing white fuming nitric acid—a quite expensive pure nitric acid in which the oxides of nitrogen have been removed, as opposed to red fuming nitric acid, which contains nitrogen oxides—and concentrated sulfuric acid. More often, this mixture is attained by the cheaper method of mixing fuming sulfuric acid, also known as oleum—sulfuric acid containing excess sulfur trioxide—and azeotropic nitric acid (consisting of about 70% nitric acid, with the rest being water).

The sulfuric acid produces protonated nitric acid species, which are attacked by glycerol's nucleophilic oxygen atoms. The nitro group is thus added as an ester C−O−NO2 and water is produced. This is different from an electrophilic aromatic substitution reaction in which nitronium ions are the electrophile.

The addition of glycerol results in an exothermic reaction (i.e., heat is produced), as usual for mixed-acid nitrations. If the mixture becomes too hot, it results in a runaway reaction, a state of accelerated nitration accompanied by the destructive oxidation of organic materials by the hot nitric acid and the release of poisonous nitrogen dioxide gas at high risk of an explosion. Thus, the glycerin mixture is added slowly to the reaction vessel containing the mixed acid (not acid to glycerin). The nitrator vessel, often constructed of iron or lead and generally stirred with compressed air, has an emergency trap door at its base, which hangs over a large pool of very cold water and into which the whole reaction mixture (called the charge) can be dumped to prevent an explosion, a process referred to as drowning.

Use as an explosive and a propellant 

The main use of nitroglycerin, by tonnage, is in explosives such as dynamite and in propellants.

Nitroglycerin is an oily liquid that may explode when subjected to heat, shock, or flame.

Alfred Nobel developed the use of nitroglycerin as a blasting explosive by mixing nitroglycerin with inert absorbents, particularly "Kieselgur", or diatomaceous earth. He named this explosive dynamite and patented it in 1867. It was supplied ready for use in the form of sticks, individually wrapped in greased waterproof paper. Dynamite and similar explosives were widely adopted for civil engineering tasks, such as in drilling highway and railroad tunnels, for mining, for clearing farmland of stumps, in quarrying, and in demolition work. Likewise, military engineers have used dynamite for construction and demolition work.

Nitroglycerin was also used as an ingredient in military propellants for use in firearms.

Nitroglycerin has been used in conjunction with hydraulic fracturing, a process used to recover oil and gas from shale formations. The technique involves displacing and detonating nitroglycerin in natural or hydraulically induced fracture systems, or displacing and detonating nitroglycerin in hydraulically induced fractures followed by wellbore shots using pelletized TNT.

Nitroglycerin has an advantage over some other high explosives that on detonation it produces practically no visible smoke. Therefore, it is useful as an ingredient in the formulation of various kinds of smokeless powder.

Its sensitivity has limited the usefulness of nitroglycerin as a military explosive, and less sensitive explosives such as TNT, RDX, and HMX have largely replaced it in munitions. It remains important in military engineering, and combat engineers still use dynamite.

Alfred Nobel then developed ballistite, by combining nitroglycerin and guncotton. He patented it in 1887. Ballistite was adopted by a number of European governments, as a military propellant. Italy was the first to adopt it. The British government and the Commonwealth governments adopted cordite instead, which had been developed by Sir Frederick Abel and Sir James Dewar of the United Kingdom in 1889. The original Cordite Mk I consisted of 58% nitroglycerin, 37% guncotton, and 5.0% petroleum jelly. Ballistite and cordite were both manufactured in the form of "cords".

Smokeless powders were originally developed using nitrocellulose as the sole explosive ingredient. Therefore, they were known as single-base propellants. A range of smokeless powders that contains both nitrocellulose and nitroglycerin, known as double-base propellants, were also developed. Smokeless powders were originally supplied only for military use, but they were also soon developed for civilian use and were quickly adopted for sports. Some are known as sporting powders. Triple-base propellants contain nitrocellulose, nitroglycerin, and nitroguanidine, but are reserved mainly for extremely high-caliber ammunition rounds such as those used in tank cannons and naval artillery. Blasting gelatin, also known as gelignite, was invented by Nobel in 1875, using nitroglycerin, wood pulp, and sodium or potassium nitrate. This was an early, low-cost, flexible explosive.

Medical use 

Nitroglycerin belongs to a group of drugs called nitrates, which includes many other nitrates like isosorbide dinitrate (Isordil) and isosorbide mononitrate (Imdur, Ismo, Monoket). These agents all exert their effect by being converted to nitric oxide in the body by mitochondrial aldehyde dehydrogenase (ALDH2), and nitric oxide is a potent natural vasodilator.

In medicine, nitroglycerin is probably most commonly prescribed for angina pectoris, a painful symptom of ischemic heart disease caused by inadequate flow of blood and oxygen to the heart and as a potent antihypertensive agent. Nitroglycerin corrects the imbalance between the flow of oxygen and blood to the heart and the heart’s energy demand. There are plenty of formulations on the market at different doses. At low doses, nitroglycerin dilates veins more than arteries, thereby reducing preload (volume of blood in the heart after filling); this is thought to be its primary mechanism of action. By decreasing preload, the heart has less blood to pump, which decreases oxygen requirement since the heart does not have to work as hard. Additionally, having a smaller preload reduces the ventricular transmural pressure (pressure exerted on the walls of the heart), which decreases the compression of heart arteries to allow more blood to flow through the heart. At higher doses, it also dilates arteries, thereby reducing afterload (decreasing the pressure against which the heart must pump). An improved ratio of myocardial oxygen demand to supply leads to the following therapeutic effects during episodes of angina pectoris: subsiding of chest pain, decrease of blood pressure, increase of heart rate, and orthostatic hypotension. Patients experiencing angina when doing certain physical activities can often prevent symptoms by taking nitroglycerin 5 to 10 minutes before the activity. Overdoses may generate methemoglobinemia.

Nitroglycerin is available in tablets, ointment, solution for intravenous use, transdermal patches, or sprays administered sublingually. Some forms of nitroglycerin last much longer in the body than others.  Nitroglycerin as well as the onset and duration of action of each form is different. The sublingual or tablet spray of nitroglycerin has a two minute onset and twenty five minute duration of action. The oral formulation of nitroglycerin has a thirty five minute onset and a duration of action of 4-8 hours. The transdermal patch has an onset of thirty minutes and a duration of action of ten to twelve hours. Continuous exposure to nitrates has been shown to cause the body to stop responding normally to this medicine. Experts recommend that the patches be removed at night, allowing the body a few hours to restore its responsiveness to nitrates. Shorter-acting preparations of nitroglycerin can be used several times a day with less risk of developing tolerance. Nitroglycerin was first used by William Murrell to treat angina attacks in 1878, with the discovery published that same year.

Industrial exposure 
Infrequent exposure to high doses of nitroglycerin can cause severe headaches known as "NG head" or "bang head". These headaches can be severe enough to incapacitate some people; however, humans develop a tolerance to and dependence on nitroglycerin after long-term exposure. Although rare, withdrawal can be fatal. Withdrawal symptoms include chest pain and other heart problems.  These symptoms may be relieved with re-exposure to nitroglycerin or other suitable organic nitrates.

For workers in nitroglycerin (NTG) manufacturing facilities, the effects of withdrawal sometimes include "Sunday heart attacks" in those experiencing regular nitroglycerin exposure in the workplace, leading to the development of tolerance for the venodilating effects. Over the weekend, the workers lose the tolerance, and when they are re-exposed on Monday, the drastic vasodilation produces a fast heart rate, dizziness, and a headache. This is referred to as "Monday disease."

People can be exposed to nitroglycerin in the workplace by breathing it in, skin absorption, swallowing it, or eye contact. The Occupational Safety and Health Administration  has set the legal limit (permissible exposure limit) for nitroglycerin exposure in the workplace as 0.2 ppm (2 mg/m3) skin exposure over an 8-hour workday. The National Institute for Occupational Safety and Health  has set a recommended exposure limit  of 0.1 mg/m3 skin exposure over an 8-hour workday. At levels of 75 mg/m3, nitroglycerin is immediately dangerous to life and health.

See also 

 Erythritol tetranitrate
 Ethylene glycol dinitrate
 Mannitol hexanitrate
 Methyl nitrate
 Tetranitratoxycarbon
 Xylitol pentanitrate
 RE factor

References

External links

 – 1866 Newspaper article
WebBook page for C3H5N3O9
CDC - NIOSH Pocket Guide to Chemical Hazards
The Tallini Tales of Destruction Detailed and horrific stories of the historical use of nitroglycerin-filled torpedoes to restart petroleum wells.
Dynamite and TNT at The Periodic Table of Videos (University of Nottingham)

Disulfiram-like drugs
Nitrate esters
Explosive chemicals
Liquid explosives
Sugar alcohol explosives
Italian inventions
Glycerol esters